Peter J. Devlin is an American sound engineer. He has been nominated for five Academy Awards in the category Best Sound. He has worked on more than 70 films since 1988.

Selected filmography
 Pearl Harbor (2001)
 Transformers (2007)
 Star Trek (2009)
 Transformers: Dark of the Moon (2011)
 Black Panther (2018)

References

External links

Year of birth missing (living people)
Living people
American audio engineers